Amblydectes is a genus of pterosaur known from jaw fragments. It apparently had a jaw flattened towards the tip and triangular in cross-section. It has at times been synonymized with Coloborhynchus, Criorhynchus, Lonchodectes, or Ornithocheirus. A 2013 study found A. crassidens and A. eurygnathus to be nomina dubia, with A. platystomus possibly belonging to a separate, yet unnamed genus. A 2021 study found A. crassidens to be a valid genus within Anhangueridae, while A. platystomus was placed in the new genus Draigwenia. A. eurygnathus was found to possibly be a junior synonym of A. crassidens.

See also
 Timeline of pterosaur research

References

Pterodactyloids
Early Cretaceous pterosaurs of Europe
Taxa named by Reginald Hooley
Fossil taxa described in 1914